Miloud Hamdi (born June 1, 1971) is an Algerian-French football manager and the current head coach of JS Kabylie.

Career
In June 2012, Hamdi was appointed as manager of Saudi Arabian club Ettifaq's under-21 team.

In 2015, Hamdi joined USM Alger's coaching staff, initially as an assistant coach before being eventually appointed as the head coach in October.

Managerial statistics

Honours

Club
USM Alger
 Ligue 1 (1): 2015-16
Runner Up CAF Champions League 2015

References

1971 births
Living people
French sportspeople of Algerian descent
French football managers
Algerian football managers
USM Alger managers
Al-Salmiya SC managers
RS Berkane managers
CS Constantine managers
Algerian Ligue Professionnelle 1 managers
Algerian expatriate football managers
Expatriate football managers in Saudi Arabia
Algerian expatriate sportspeople in Saudi Arabia
Expatriate football managers in Kuwait
Algerian expatriate sportspeople in Kuwait
Expatriate football managers in Morocco
Algerian expatriate sportspeople in Morocco